Joe Downing (June 26, 1903 in New York City, New York – October 16, 1975 in Canoga Park, California) was an American stage, TV and B-movie actor who made more than 70 appearances.

Downing's early acting experience included work with the Theatre Guild, particularly dancing in The Garrick Gaieties. His Broadway credits include Ramshackle Inn (1944), Cross-town (1937), Dead End (1935), Ceiling Zero (1935), Page Miss Glory (1934), The Drums Begin (1933), Heat Lightning (1933), Shooting Star (1933), and A Farewell to Arms (1930).

Downing's film debut came in Doctor Socrates. Often cast as gangsters, his film credits include A Slight Case of Murder, Danger on the Air, Racket Busters, Each Dawn I Die and The Big Shot. His television credits include three appearances on Alfred Hitchcock Presents from 1956 to 1958, as well as other anthology series popular during the era.

Partial filmography

The Case of the Lucky Legs (1935) - George Sanborne
Dr. Socrates (1935) - Cinq Laval
Borrowing Trouble (1937) - Charlie
A Slight Case of Murder (1938) - Innocence
Wide Open Faces (1938) - Stretch
The Lady in the Morgue (1938) - Steve Collins
The Devil's Party (1938) - Frank Diamond
Danger on the Air (1938) - Joe Carney
Racket Busters (1938) - Joe Pender, Martin's Henchman
I Am the Law (1938) - Tom Cronin (uncredited)
The Night Hawk (1938) - Lefty
Angels with Dirty Faces (1938) - Steve
North of Shanghai (1939) - Chandler
You Can't Get Away with Murder (1939) - Smitty
Torchy Runs for Mayor (1939) - Spuds O'Brien
The Forgotten Woman (1939) - Johnny Bradshaw
Each Dawn I Die (1939) - Limpy Julien
Smashing the Money Ring (1939) - Dice Mathews
Beware Spooks! (1939) - (uncredited)
Missing Evidence (1939) - Marty Peters
Another Thin Man (1939) - Hoodlum (uncredited)
Invisible Stripes (1939) - Johnny
Oh Johnny, How You Can Love (1940) - 'Doc' Kendrick - Bank Robber
Castle on the Hudson (1940) - Gangster in Car (uncredited)
Sandy Is a Lady (1940) - Nick Case
The Secret Seven (1940) - Lou Bodie
The San Francisco Docks (1940) - Cassidy
Tall, Dark and Handsome (1941) - Cigar Store Killer (uncredited)
Double Date (1941) - Burglar
Strange Alibi (1941) - Benny McKaye
Belle Starr (1941) - Jim Cole
Unholy Partners (1941) - Jerry - Henchman
Johnny Eager (1941) - Ryan
Sealed Lips (1942) - Trigger Dolan (uncredited)
Larceny, Inc. (1942) - Smitty
My Gal Sal (1942) - Slip (uncredited)
The Big Shot (1942) - Frenchy
You Can't Escape Forever (1942) - Varney (uncredited)
Lucky Jordan (1942) - Harrison (uncredited)
Las Vegas Shakedown (1955) - Henchman Matty
Fighting Trouble (1956) - Handsome Hal Lomax
Alfred Hitchcock Presents TV series. Episode: "Place Of Shadows" (1956) - Floyd Unser (as Joseph Downing)
Slaughter on Tenth Avenue (1957) - Eddie 'Cockeye' Cook

References

External links

1903 births
1975 deaths
American male film actors
American male television actors
20th-century American male actors
Male actors from New York City